For OpenBSD 3.7, released May 19, 2005, a theme song was made titled "The Wizard of OS". The song chronicled the OpenBSD developers' struggle to obtain open documentation for wireless cards and how manufacturers in Taiwan like Ralink and Realtek were the most cooperative of all the companies contacted. It was based on the work of Pink Floyd most notably in the style of their 1973 album The Dark Side of the Moon showing some similarities to "The Great Gig in the Sky", "Breathe" and "Eclipse". It is a parody of The Wizard of Oz.

It was for this effort which Theo de Raadt, the project's Benevolent Dictator for Life, received the FSF's 2004 Award for the Advancement of Free Software.

Personnels 
 Jonathan Lewis - lead vocals
 Adele Legere - female vocals
 Ty Semaka - lyrics, monkeys and laughing sounds
 Anita Miotti - little girl voice
 Reed Shimozawa - lead guitar
 Jonathan Lewis - drums, bass and all other sounds

The song was co-arranged by Ty Semaka and Jonathan Lewis (who also recorded, mixed and mastered the song).

References

External links 
 http://www.openbsd.org/lyrics.html#37 - Lyrics and MP3/OGG downloads

OpenBSD
2005 songs